The Midnight Ride of Paul Revere is a 1931 painting by the American artist Grant Wood. It depicts the American patriot Paul Revere during his midnight ride on April 18, 1775. The perspective is from a high altitude as Revere rides through a brightly lit Lexington, Massachusetts. It was inspired by the poem "Paul Revere's Ride" by Henry Wadsworth Longfellow. Wood used a child's hobby horse as model for Revere's horse.

The painting is located at the Metropolitan Museum of Art in New York City, but is not on view as of spring, 2017.

Provenance
The painting belonged to Mr. and Mrs. Cecil M. Gooch in Memphis, Tennessee from 1931 to 1950, after which it was given to YWCA Memphis as a gift. The same year it was sold for 15,000 dollars to the Metropolitan Museum of Art.

References

1931 paintings
Adaptations of works by Henry Wadsworth Longfellow
Paintings by Grant Wood
Paintings in the collection of the Metropolitan Museum of Art
Cultural depictions of Paul Revere
Paintings based on literature
Churches in art
Horses in art

https://artistshomes.org/site/grant-wood-studio